Now Apocalypse is an American comedy television series that aired for one season of ten episodes from March 10 to May 12, 2019, on Starz. The series was written by Gregg Araki and Karley Sciortino. Araki also was director and executive producer alongside Steven Soderbergh and Gregory Jacobs. Starz canceled the series on July 26, 2019.

Premise
Ulysses, his friends Carly and Ford, and Ford's girlfriend Severine navigate love, sex, and fame in Los Angeles. Troubled by sinister, premonitory dreams, Ulysses wonders if the end of the world as we know it is coming, or if he is simply suffering some kind of marijuana-fueled delusions.

Cast and characters

Main
 Avan Jogia as Ulysses Zane, Carly's best friend.
 Kelli Berglund as Carly Carlson, the best friend of Ulysses, who also happens to be a struggling actress and cam girl. According to Uly, Carly also suffers from anxiety.
 Beau Mirchoff as Ford Halstead, Ulysses' straight roommate.
 Roxane Mesquida as Severine Bordeaux, Ford's girlfriend.

Recurring
 Evan Hart as Lars
 Taylor Hart as Klaus
 Tyler Posey as Gabriel
 Desmond Chiam as Jethro
 Kevin Daniels as Barnabas
 Grace Victoria Cox as Amber
 Mary Lynn Rajskub as Frank
 Chris Aquilino as Kai
 Avra Friedman as Magenta
 Henry Rollins as Mitchell Kent
 RJ Mitte as Leif
 Jacob Artist as Isaac
 James Duval as Homeless man

Episodes

Production

Development
Gregg Araki was inspired to do television by the mystery series Twin Peaks, which he called "so ground-breaking and artistic and unusual and just its totally own thing". He directed episodes of several television series, but was hesitant to run his own show until he thought about the story potential of life in Los Angeles. Araki presented the idea to writer Karley Sciortino, who started working with him on the script. Gregory Jacobs, who had worked with Araki on Red Oaks, joined the project and brought in Steven Soderbergh. The production designer, costume designer, and director of photography have previously worked on other projects with Araki.

On March 26, 2018, it was announced that Starz had given Now Apocalypse a series order for a first season of ten episodes. The series is written by Araki and Sciortino, and directed by Araki. The series is executive produced by Soderbergh, Jacobs, and Araki. On December 10, 2018, it was announced that the series would premiere on March 10, 2019. On March 22, 2019, the eight remaining episodes of season one were released online and on demand. They also continued to air weekly.

Starz canceled the series on July 26, 2019. Araki later stated that he was shopping the series to other networks.

Casting
In June 2018, it was announced that Avan Jogia, Kelli Berglund, Beau Mirchoff, and Roxane Mesquida had joined the main cast and that Evan Hart, Taylor Hart, Tyler Posey, Jacob Artist, Chris Aquilino, Desmond Chiam, RJ Mitte, and Grace Victoria Cox had been cast in recurring roles. On July 2, 2018, it was reported that Kevin Daniels and Avra Friedman had joined the cast in a recurring capacity.

Filming
The ten episodes of the series were shot in 40 days.

Reception

Critical response
On Rotten Tomatoes the series holds an approval rating of 78% based on 32 reviews, with an average score of 6.42 out of 10. The website's critical consensus reads: "Marrying filmmaker Gregg Araki's frisky style with heady conspiracies and literary allusions, Now Apocalypses bodacious aesthetics and philosophical pondering may prove too deliberately offbeat and garish for some." Metacritic assigned the series a weighted average score of 64 out of 100 based on 12 critics, indicating "generally favorable reviews".

Ratings

References

External links

2010s American LGBT-related comedy television series
2010s American sitcoms
2019 American television series debuts
2019 American television series endings
Apocalyptic television series
English-language television shows
Starz original programming
Bisexuality-related television series
Male bisexuality in fiction